Darling Downs was an electoral district of the Legislative Assembly in the Australian state of Queensland. It was named for the Darling Downs region.

The district covered rural areas in southern Queensland to the immediate west and north of Toowoomba, not including the city itself. Darling Downs included the towns of Dalby, Oakey and Crows Nest. The electorate was first created for the 2001 election.

In 2008, Darling Downs was abolished–with effect at the 2009 state election–following a redistribution undertaken by the Electoral Commission of Queensland. Its former territory and voters were divided between the districts of Warrego, Nanango, Toowoomba North and a new seat called Condamine.

An earlier district based in the same region was also called Darling Downs. It existed as a single member electorate from 1873 to 1878 and as a dual member electorate from 1878 to 1888.

Members for Darling Downs

Election results

See also
 Division of Darling Downs
 Electoral district of Darling Downs (New South Wales)
 Electoral districts of Queensland
 Members of the Queensland Legislative Assembly by year
 :Category:Members of the Queensland Legislative Assembly by name

References

 

Darling Downs
Former electoral districts of Queensland